David James Tholen (born 1955) is an American astronomer at the Institute for Astronomy of the University of Hawaii. He holds a 1984 PhD from the University of Arizona, and specializes in planetary and Solar System astronomy. He is a discoverer of minor planets and known for the Tholen spectral classification scheme used on asteroids.

Professional life 

He won the H. C. Urey Prize in 1990.

He co-discovered the asteroid 99942 Apophis (previously known as ). This asteroid will closely approach Earth on April 13, 2029 and very briefly appear as bright as a third magnitude star.

In 1995, Tholen obtained images of the then newly discovered comet Hale-Bopp at a time when the comet was moving very slowly with respect to the background stars, thus permitting the red- green- and blue-filtered images to be combined into a color composite without the background stars appearing as separately colored dots. This color composite image was made publicly accessible via the Institute of Astronomy's web site.

Later, then postdoc at University of Hawaii, Olivier R. Hainaut discovered that a nearly identical image was being discussed by late-night radio host Art Bell and one of his guests, Courtney Brown, who claimed that it proved the existence of an unnatural object following the comet, something supposedly seen by those who had learned how to engage in the technique of "remote viewing". The image provided to Bell by Brown, and eventually made public on Bell's web site, did indeed show an object next to the comet that did not appear in archival images of the sky. In reality, that image had been digitally altered from the original image posted by Tholen, presumably by taking the image of a star near the edge of the frame, adding it next to the comet, and then trimming away the outer edges of the frame.

Tholen and Hainaut exposed the fraud by producing the original image, which showed no such additional object. Nevertheless, some conspiracy theorists maintained that Brown's version was actually the original image and that Tholen had removed the additional object from the one on the Institute's web site. The Heaven's Gate cult was so convinced that the additional object was a spaceship coming to take them away from Earth that they committed mass suicide.

The Mars-crosser asteroid 3255 Tholen, discovered by Edward Bowell in 1980, is named after David Tholen.

Personal interests 

David Tholen and Roy Tucker, co-discovers of 99942 Apophis, are both fans of the TV series Stargate SG-1, which influenced the naming of the asteroid. The show's most persistent villain is "Apophis", an alien also named for the Egyptian god. "We considered a number of names, but 'Apophis' kept floating to the top," says Tucker. "Apophis was a very fitting name for  not only because of its threatening nature, but also because of its evolution from an Aten asteroid to an Apollo asteroid during the 2029 encounter.".

Tholen is a fan of the University of Kansas Jayhawks college basketball team and the Kansas City Royals Major League Baseball team.

He also plays clarinet and bass clarinet for the Honolulu Community Concert Band and the Oahu Community Orchestra.

He is also a user of the OS/2, Linux, Windows, Solaris, and Mac OS operating systems.

Tholen frequently posts to various Usenet groups using the alias tholen@antispam.ham.

List of discovered minor planets

See also 
 Asteroid spectral types

References

External links 
 Homepage
 Tholen responds to faked images

1955 births
American astronomers
Discoverers of asteroids

Living people
Planetary scientists
University of Arizona alumni
University of Hawaiʻi faculty